David Henry is a Gaelic footballer who played at senior level for the Dublin county team and plays his club football for Raheny. He was on the Dublin Leinster Senior Football Championship winning side in 2005, 2006, 2007 and 2008. Henry played at right half back on the Dublin senior football team. He came on as a substitute and was later sent off in the O'Byrne Cup final for Dublin against Laois at O'Connor Park in Offaly. The game finished on a scoreline of 1-18 to 2-13 against Laois. David was on Dublin's 2008 O'Byrne Cup winning team, which defeated Longford in the final. He also played senior hurling with Dublin. David has worked as an analyst for Irish language television station TG4. He also worked as a youth leader at Coláiste Árainn Mhóir in Donegal during his summer holidays during college, assisting in teaching Irish to teenagers.

David was part of the 2011 Dublin All Ireland winning squad who beat Kerry 1-12 to 1-11 in the 2011 All-Ireland Senior Football Championship Final.

David went to NUI Maynooth as a hurler under their GAA scholarship programme.

References

External links
 Raheny GAA Website

Year of birth missing (living people)
Living people
Alumni of St Patrick's College, Maynooth
Dual players
Dublin hurlers
Dublin inter-county Gaelic footballers
Gaelic football backs
Raheny GAA footballers